Manu-kura was a famous warrior in the Tuamotuan version of the Rata cycle of Polynesian mythology. His home was in the ocean.  

He married Pupura-to-te-tai, the daughter of Puna, king of the Underworld. When Rata met him, they had a contest of magic girdles that Rata won, claiming Pupura as his prize. He took her to his home, where she stayed while he continued his quest to avenge his father.

References
R.D. Craig, Dictionary of Polynesian Mythology (Greenwood Press: New York, 1989), 156; 
J.F. Stimson, Tuamotuan Legends: Island of Anaa (Honolulu: Bernice P. Bishop Museum Press, 1937), 126–129.

Tuamotu mythology